Phyllonorycter himalayana is a moth of the family Gracillariidae. It is known from the Nepal.

The wingspan is about 9 mm.

The larvae feed on Quercus semecarpifolia. They mine the leaves of their host plant. The mine has the form of a rather large, elliptical or circular, slightly tentiformed blotch occurring upon the upper surface of the leaf, usually situated on the space between the middle vein and the leaf-margin. The upper epidermis of the leaf on the mining part is whitish-brown, smeared with irregular, dark reddish-brown blotches or lines and with many minute, longitudinal ridges in the fully matured stage.

References

himalayana
Moths of Asia
Moths described in 1973